A subway party is a celebration that occurs on a mass transit system. Generally, people meet at a predetermined station in their city's mass transit system, wait until their numbers have achieved critical mass, and board the train. From there, revelers may engage in many different activities, from playing music and dancing to exchanging gifts.

There are several kinds of subway parties, the two most distinct being the rush hour subway party and the late night subway party.

Types of Party

Rush hour subway parties aim to spread joy to commuters, whose daily treks into the center of their metropolis can be long, boring or stressful. Several subway party groups have boarded subway cars dressed in goat skins to give presents to commuters, and have been known to play parcheesi, wear wings and sprinkle moon dust on the willing.

Late night subway parties are for the enjoyment of the attendees. Party-goers don costumes, decorate the subway car, bring musical instruments and sometimes the parties have a theme.

On nights that are especially festive such as New Year's or World Cup victories, a spontaneous subway party may occur. People may already be drinking above ground and decide to board the subway. When this happens, the general feeling of revelry continues below ground.

Critics of subway parties of this kind say that, by introducing chaos, these activities may place the already-crowded subway riders in danger or cause delays. Also, some people may simply become annoyed by them.

With the advent of email and cellphones, invitations to subway parties can now be distributed electronically. The party usually starts at one subway station and acquires more participants as it proceeds through the system. The instructions often ask people to meet by the last car of the train.

History of the subway party
In 1904, the New York City Subway system's first line opened. Photographs from the event show people dressed in tuxedos and top hats and drinking champagne to celebrate.

In the 1980s, Michael Alig and the Club Kids threw parties on New York City subway trains where they purportedly took the drug ecstasy. The events were promoted through word of mouth and telephones. These parties are detailed in the book Disco Bloodbath.

In 2005, the Toronto Transit Commission declared October "culture month", perhaps inspired by recent subway parties in the city. This campaign included "culture cars", which were randomly selected cars that contained spontaneous, professional singing, dancing and music.

Today, subway parties are only loosely related to the flash mob phenomenon. The details for subway parties are published on blogs, websites and mailing lists. People assemble seemingly spontaneously in dozens of cities throughout the world.

See also 
Flashmob
Circle Line Party
Newmindspace
Improv Toronto

References

Sources
McGinn, Dave. "Don't stop the guerrilla party train". Dose magazine, 18 Aug 2005.
Lazarovic, Sarah. "Revelers See Stars at Underground Celebration". The Globe and Mail, 16 Aug 2005.
"Subway parties". CBC's The Hour with George Stroumboulopoulos, 12 Dec 2005.
James St. James. "Disco Bloodbath: A Fabulous But True Tale of Murder in Clubland".

Subway parties
Culture jamming